is a Japanese actress, singer and former idol.

History

Biography
She was born in Urasoe, Okinawa, Japan, into a fisherman's family, the youngest of five siblings.

At the start of her career she was a gravure idol and singer (her debut single "Moonlight to Daybreak" was released in 1996), and appeared in bit roles until her career breakthrough playing Sadako in "Ring 0: Birthday (2000)."

In 2000, Nakama demonstrated her talent for comedy with her lead role in the Japanese television drama Trick which proved so popular that it had two more seasons and four film versions, but it was the top-rating 2002 TV series Gokusen, a live-action version of the popular manga, that established her as one of Japan's most popular and bankable actresses. Gokusen continued on for 3 seasons, which had many cameo appearances by actors who were on previous seasons. She is also known for her role in the drama, Saki, which Co-starred Shohei Miura.

Nakama has featured in commercials for companies such as Nissin Foods, Glico, Lotte, Asahi, Shiseido, au by KDDI, and has served as a spokesperson for Japan Railways and the Japanese Tax Agency. She is managed by Production Ogi.

Personal life
Nakama married actor Tetsushi Tanaka on September 18, 2014, after a six-year relationship. Nakama was revealed to be 4 months pregnant in February 2018. She gave birth to twin sons in June 2018.

Filmography

TV series
 Mō gaman Dekinai (1996)
 Itazura na Kiss (1996)
 Tomoko no Baai (1996)
 Mokuyō no Kaidan 15 (1997)
 Dangerous Angel x Death Hunter (1997) (Episode 4 guest star)
 Shiawase Iro Shashinkan (1997)
 Odoru Daisōsasen Saimatsu Tokubetsu Keikai (1997)
 Kamisama mō Sukoshi dake (1998)
 Hashire Kōmuin! (1998)
 Kimi to Ita Mirai no Tame ni: I'll be Back (1999)
 P.S. Genki desu, Shunpei (1999)
 Aoi Tokugawa Sandai (2000)
 Nisennen no Koi / Love 2000 (2000)
 Trick (2000)
 Face: Mishiranu Koibito (2001)
 Ashita ga Arusa (2001)
 Uso Koi (2001)
 Trick 2 (2002)
 Gokusen (2002)
 Night Hospital Byōki wa Nemuranai (2002)
 Musashi (2003)
 Gokusen Special Sayonara 3-nen D-gumi ... Yankumi Namida no Sotsugyoshiki (2003)
 Kao (2003)
 Trick 3 (2003)
 Ranpo R (2004) (Episode 3 guest star)
 Tokyo Wankei (2004)
 Otouto (2004)
 Gokusen 2 (2005)
 Haru to Natsu (2005)
 Trick TV Special (2005)
 NHK Taiga Drama "Kōmyō ga Tsuji" (2006) as Yamauchi Chiyo
 Satomi Hakkenden (2006)
 Erai Tokoro ni Totsuide Shimatta! (2007)
 Himawari: Natsume Masako 27-nen no Shōgai to Haha no Ai (2007) as Masako Natsume
 Joshi Deka (2007)
 Gokusen 3 (2008)
 Arifureta Kiseki (2009)
 Mr. Brain (Episode 6 guest actress) (2009)
 Nene: Onna Taikōki (2009)
 Untouchable as Narumi Ryoko (TV Asahi, 2009)
 Japanese Americans (2010) as Hiramatsu (Matsusawa) Shinobu
 Utsukushii Rinjin (2011)
 Tempest (2011)
 Renai Neet: Wasureta Koi no Hajimekata (2012)
 Ghost Mama Sosasen (2012)
 Saki (2013)
 Island's Teacher (2013)
 Jinsei ga Tokimeku Katazuke no Mahou (2013)
 Hanako to Anne (2014)
 Beauty And The Fellow / Beauty And The Man (2015)
 Aibō: season 16 (2016)
 Rakuen (2017)
 School Counselor (2017)
 Ōoku the Final (2019)
 24 Japan as Urara Asakura (2020)
 Aibō: season 19 (2020)
 Chimudondon (2022) as Yūko Higa

Films
 Tomoko no Baai (1996)
 Love & Pop (1998)
 Martian Successor Nadesico: The Motion Picture – Prince of Darkness (1998)  voice:Lapis Lazuli
 Gamera 3: Revenge of Iris (1999)
 Ring 0: Birthday (2000)
 Oboreru Sakana (2001)
 Love Song (2001)
 Trick Movie (2002)
 Ashita ga Arusa, The Movie (2002)
 G@me (2003)
 Shinobi: Heart Under Blade (2005)
 Trick 2 (2006)
 Oh! Oku (2006)
 Watashi wa Kai ni Naritai  (2008)
 Gokusen the Movie (2009)
 Flowers (2010)
 Gekijoban Trick – Reinoryokusha Battle Royale (2010)
 Tempest 3D (2012)
 Giovanni's Island (2014) 
 The Big Bee (2015)
 Fullmetal Alchemist: The Final Alchemy (2022), Trisha Elric

Anime
Haunted Junction, theme song performances "Kokoro ni watashi ga futari iru" & "Tremolo" (1997)
The Prince of Darkness (Nadesico) (1998)

Video games
Rockman X4, theme song performances, "Makenai Ai ga kitto aru" & "One More Chance" (1997)

Dubbing
Shining Time Station, DiDi the Drummer (1989–1995)
Jurassic World (2017 NTV edition), Claire Dearing (Bryce Dallas Howard)

Discography

Singles
 "Moonlight to Daybreak" (1996)
  (1996) True Love Story theme song
  (1997)
  (1997) Mega Man X4 OP & ED and Don't Leave Me Alone, Daisy Ending Theme
  (1997) Haunted Junction
  (1998)
 "Birthday/I Feel You" (2000) Ring 0: Birthday image song
  (2001)
  (2006) [as Yukie with Downloads]

Albums
  (1998)

Awards
Japanese Drama Academy Awards:
Spring 2002: Best Actress for Gokusen
Spring 2003: Best Actress for Kao
Fall 2003: Best Actress for Trick 3
Summer 2004: Best Dresser for Tokyo Wankei
Winter 2005: Best Actress for Gokusen 2

Japan Academy Prize (film)
2009: Nominated Outstanding Performance by an Actress in a Leading Role for Watashi wa Kai ni Naritai

Elan d'or Awards
2003: Newcomer of the Year

References

External links
Official Page 
Yukie Nakama on Sony Music Online Japan 

 Yukie Nakama at GamePlaza-Haruka Voice Acting Database 
 Yukie Nakama at Hitoshi Doi's Seiyuu Database

1979 births
Living people
Voice actresses from Okinawa Prefecture
Japanese women pop singers
Sony Music Entertainment Japan artists
Japanese voice actresses
21st-century Japanese actresses
20th-century Japanese actresses
Musicians from Okinawa Prefecture
Taiga drama lead actors
21st-century Japanese singers
21st-century Japanese women singers
Japanese television actresses